Andrew Galbraith Miller (September 18, 1801 – September 30, 1874) was an American lawyer and judge.  He was the first United States district judge of the Eastern District of Wisconsin after having served as the only Judge of the United States District Court for the District of Wisconsin.  Prior to Wisconsin statehood, he served as a justice of the Supreme Court of Wisconsin Territory.

Education and career

Born on September 18, 1801, in Carlisle, Pennsylvania, Miller attended Dickinson College and received a Bachelor of Arts degree in 1819 from Washington College (now Washington & Jefferson College), then read law in 1822. He entered private practice in Gettysburg, Pennsylvania, from 1822 to 1838, and served as Attorney General of Pennsylvania. On November 8, 1838, he was commissioned Associate Justice of the Supreme Court of the Wisconsin Territory by President Martin Van Buren and served in that role until Wisconsin became a state.

Federal judicial service

Following the State of Wisconsin's admission to the Union on May 28, 1848, Miller was nominated by President James K. Polk on June 12, 1848, to the United States District Court for the District of Wisconsin, to a new seat authorized by 9 Stat. 56. He was confirmed by the United States Senate on June 12, 1848, and received his commission the same day. When Wisconsin was split into an Eastern and Western district, in 1870, Miller was reassigned by operation of law to the United States District Court for the Eastern District of Wisconsin on June 30, 1870, to a new seat authorized by 16 Stat. 171. His service terminated on January 1, 1873, due to his retirement. Miller was the last federal judge in active service to have been appointed by President Polk.

Notable cases

During the difficult pre-American Civil War era, Miller upheld the Fugitive Slave Act of 1850 and federal jurisdiction in the Sherman Booth and John Rycraft cases (1854–1855). He also laid down important legal precedents concerning foreclosure of railroad properties and the organization of new companies in cases involving the La Crosse and Milwaukee Railroad, the Milwaukee and St. Paul Railroad, and other railroad companies.

Personal life

Miller was descended from Irish American immigrants who settled in the Province of Pennsylvania in the colonial era.  His father, Matthew Miller, was a volunteer in the Pennsylvania militia during the War of 1812.

In 1827, Miller married Caroline E. Kurtz of Harrisburg, Pennsylvania.  Her brother was Benjamin Kurtz, who helped to establish the Lutheran church in America.  Miller and his wife had at least three sons, though only two survived him.

Andrew G. Miller died on September 30, 1874, in Milwaukee, Wisconsin. He was interred at Forest Home Cemetery in Milwaukee.

References

External links
 

1801 births
1874 deaths
Washington & Jefferson College alumni
Pennsylvania lawyers
Wisconsin Territory judges
Judges of the United States District Court for the District of Wisconsin
United States federal judges appointed by James K. Polk
19th-century American judges
Judges of the United States District Court for the Eastern District of Wisconsin
People from Carlisle, Pennsylvania
United States federal judges admitted to the practice of law by reading law